The Defence School of Policing and Guarding is the training centre for the Service Police of the British Armed Forces. It consolidates training for the Royal Navy Police, Royal Military Police and Royal Air Force Police in one location, assuring consistent standards across the services. The centre was established at Southwick Park, near Portsmouth, Hampshire, in 2005.

History
The regimental headquarters of the Royal Military Police moved to the site following withdrawal from Roussillon Barracks, Chichester. RAF Police training moved from RAF Halton in 2005.

Sometime prior to 2015, the name of the establishment changed from College to School.

Military police training

The facilities allow training in most aspects of policing, including Crime Scene Investigation.

Royal Military Police
Soldiers entering the Royal Military Police are posted to the school having completed Phase 1 training at the Army Training Centre Pirbright. Successful completion results in promotion to lance corporal and posting to an operational unit as a probationer. Officers for the Royal Military Police undertake training on completion of commissioning courses at Royal Military Academy Sandhurst.

Royal Air Force Police
Airmen and Airwomen are posted to the School having completed Phase 1 training at RAF Halton.  Successful completion results in the individual being promoted to Corporal and being posted to an operational unit. Officers of the Royal Air Force Police undertake training on completion of commissioning at Royal Air Force College Cranwell.

Royal Navy Police
Royal Marines candidates are not recruited directly but are transferred from other branches where they have qualified for promotion to corporal or leading hand before being posted to the school, having completed a 4-week suitability assessment. Some Royal Navy candidates are now recruited directly. On completion of training they will be promoted to the rank and posted to an operational unit. Officers for the Royal Navy Police are drawn from the rating corps as senior upper yardmen and are commissioned following training at Britannia Royal Naval College or Commando Training Centre Royal Marines.

References

External links 
 Roles: Royal Military Police Officer at army.mod.uk
 Roles: Royal Military Police Soldier

Adjutant General's Corps
City of Winchester
Military education and training in Hampshire
Military police academies
Military police of the United Kingdom
Military training establishments of the United Kingdom
Organisations based in Hampshire
2005 establishments in England